Linda Cajio is a US writer of over 30 romance novels. She started writing contemporary romances in 1986 for Loveswept, and she also wrote historical romances for Kensington and Zebra. She was nominee from Romantic Times Magazine to Best Harlequin American in 1997 and to Series Romantic Fantary in 1999.

Bibliography

Single novels
All Is Fair... (1986)
Hard Habit to Break (1986)
Double Dealing (1987)
Silk on the Skin (1988)
Strictly Business (1988)
The Reluctant Prince (1992)
Dancing in the Dark (1993)
Colorado Gold (1993)
Irresistible Stranger (1994)
The Perfect Catch (1995)
Hot and Bothered (1995)
Knight's Song (1996)
A Tender Masquerade (1997)

Roberts-Windsor Series
Rescuing Diana (1987)
At First Sight (1988)

Kittredge Family Saga
Desperate Measures (1989)
Unforgettable (1989)
Just One Look (1990)
Nights in White Satin (1991)
Earth Angel (1991)
Night Music (1991)

The Holiday Heart Saga
Doctor Valentine (1997)
Bachelor Daddy (1997)
Boss Man (1997)
Mister Christmas (1997)
Doorstep Daddy (1998)

Only Dad Series Multi-Author
Me and Mrs. Jones (1993)

Treasured Tales II Series Multi-Author
He's So Shy (1994)

The Ultimate… Series Multi-Author
House Husband (1998)

The Daddy Club Series Multi-Author
Family to Be (2000)

Collections
Diamond Daddies (1999)

References and sources

American romantic fiction novelists
Living people
American women novelists
Women romantic fiction writers
20th-century American novelists
20th-century American women writers
1953 births
21st-century American women